Cornel Stan (born April 28, 1951 in Constanța, Romania), is a German engineer and professor.

Life and career

Stan studied aerospace engineering at the Polytechnic University of Bucharest. He received his doctorate in 1984 in the field of internal combustion engines at the Technical University of Zwickau and completed his habilitation there in 1989 in the field of automotive engineering. From 1984 he worked for the MZ-Motorradwerk Zschopau (successor to DKW) for seven years, where he was in a leading position in the development of future drives. 

In 1992 Stan was appointed professor for technical thermodynamics at the University of Applied Sciences in Zwickau, later the West Saxon University of Applied Sciences in Zwickau (Westsächsische Hochschule Zwickau), where he later also became director of the Institute for Automotive Technology. His teaching and research areas include motor vehicle drive systems, direct injection processes, simulation of thermodynamic processes, combustion processes, alternative fuels  and energy management in vehicles. His specialist books on thermodynamics, alternative drives for automobiles and direct injection systems for gasoline and diesel engines are included in many of the major national libraries around the world. Stan is the author or co-author of more than 30 specialist books, over 150 scientific articles and 40 international patents, in particular on unconventional injection processes in internal combustion engines.

In 1994 he became chairman of the board and scientific director of the newly founded research and transfer center e.V. at the West Saxon University of Applied Sciences in Zwickau (FTZ Zwickau), whose activities are currently focused on automotive engineering and electronics, electromagnetic compatibility, electrical power engineering, new technologies and materials in mechanical engineering and laser technology. 

From 1994 to 1996 Stan was appointed Honorary Professor (Professore a Contratto) at the Universita degli Studi di Pisa, Italy, and in 1998 and 1999 Honorary Professor at the Universita degli Studi di Perugia, Italy.  In 2002, 2003, 2004 he was Honorary Professor (1st class des Professeurs) at the  Université Pierre et Marie Curie, Paris, France. In 2005/2006 he was Russell Severance Springer Professor of Mechanical Engineering (Invited Professor) at the University of California, Berkeley, USA. 

Between 2000 and 2010 Stan served as a Member of the Editorial Board of the Journal of Automobile Engineering, Institution of Mechanical Engineers ImechE, UK. Since 2012 he has been editor-in-chief of the magazine Ingineria Automobilului (Automotive Engineering) of the SIAR - Romanian Association of Automotive Engineers.

Stan organized and led several international congresses and conferences, among others: "Alternative Propulsion Systems for Automobiles", Essen 2000; "Development Trends of Motorcycles", Zwickau 2002, Munich 2003, Borgo Panigale / Ducati, 2004, 2005, 2007; “Alternative Propulsion Systems for Automobiles", Berlin 2007, Munich 2009; "VDIK-Future Propulsion of Automobiles", AMI Leipzig, 2009, 2010, 2012, 2014, 2016.

Stan is also the author of well-known novels published in German, English and Romanian. Among his novels are the "Automacher" and "Dracfried".

Stan´s languages for publications, courses and conferences are German, English, French, Italian and Romanian.

Awards and distinctions
 Fellow of the Society of Automotive Engineers SAE International, 2008
 Honorary Professor at Transilvania University of Brasov, Romania, 2004
 Doctor Honoris Causa at Transilvania University of Brasov, Romania, 2005
 Doctor Honoris Causa at Ovidius University of Constanta, Romania, 2018
 Doctor Honoris Causa at University of Craiova, Romania, 2022

Bibliography

Books (selection)
 Stan, C.: Alternative Propulsion for Automobiles , Springer Nature Switzerland 2017, 
 Stan, C.: Direct Injection Systems – The Next Decade in Engine Technology, SAE International, Warrendale, USA 2002, 
 Stan, C.: Direct Injection Systems for Spark-Ignition and Compression Ignition Engines, SAE International Edition, Warrendale / USA, 2000, 	
 Stan, C.: (Publisher) et al.: Development Trends of Motorcycles IV, Expert Verlag 2012, 
 Sher, E. (Publisher) et al.: Handbook of Air Pollution from Internal Combustion Engines (Chapter 12 by C. Stan), Academic Press, San Diego / USA, 1998, 
 Stan, C.: Cipolla, G. (Publishers) et al.: Alternative Propulsion Systems for Automobiles II, Expert Verlag, Renningen, 2008, 
 Stan, C.: Thermodynamics for Machines and Automobile Engineering – in German (Thermodynamik für Maschinen- und Fahrzeugbau), Springer Vieweg, 2020, DOI: 10.1007/978-3-662-61790-8
 Stan, C.: Alternative Propulsion Systems for Automobiles – in German (Alternative Antriebe für Automobile), 5th Edition, Springer Vieweg, 2020, 
 Stan, C.: Automobile Thermodynamics – Basics, Applications and Process Simulations – in German (Thermodynamik des Kraftfahrzeugs – Grundlagen und Anwendungen – mit Prozesssimulationen) 3rd Edition, 2017, Springer Vieweg 2017, 
 Stan, C. (Publisher): Trends in the Automobiles Development - in German - (Entwicklungstendenzen im Automobilbau), Zschiesche Verlag, 2004,

Novels
 Stan, C.: Carmakers – A Novel, Coresi Publishing, 2017,  (English)
 Stan, C.: Dracfried – Dracula versus Diesel – A Vampire Novel, Coresi Publishing, 2017,  (English)

References

External links
 Cornel Stan books in Library of Congress, USA, www.loc.gov/ all items/books/cornel stan
 Cornel Stan books in British Library www.bl.uk/9783319319292
 Cornel Stan  publications indexed by Google Scholar
 Cornel Stan  publications indexed by jstor
 Bibliothèque Nationale de France, catalogue.bnf.fr Stan, Cornel 
 German National Library,  d-nb.info  Cornel Stan
 https://journals.indexcopernicus.com/search/journal/issue?issueId=183304&journalId=7867
 researchgate.net/scientific-contributions/Cornel Stan
 EPA National Library Network, Cornel Stan, fuel injection

1951 births
Living people
People from Constanța
German engineers